Epiphyas eveleena is a species of moth of the family Tortricidae. It is found in Australia, where it has been recorded from South Australia and Western Australia.

The wingspan is about 18 mm.

References

Moths described in 1916
Epiphyas